The Miracle of the Bells is a 1948 American drama film produced by RKO. It stars Fred MacMurray, Alida Valli, Frank Sinatra, and Lee J. Cobb. Directed by Irving Pichel, with a script by Quentin Reynolds and Ben Hecht.

The film is based on a novel by Russell Janney.

Plot
Hollywood press agent Bill Dunnigan, who works for a movie studio, arrives by train with the body of actress Olga Treskovna, in her hometown of Coaltown, Pennsylvania, named for its coal mining industry. In a voiceover narrated by Dunnigan, we learn that he was in love with Olga, although he never told her; we also never find out if she loved him. He has brought her back to Coaltown to honor her deathbed request to be buried there. He encounters hostility from the local funeral director who resents her because she never finished paying for her father's burial. After being pressured by the funeral director and the pastor of the larger and more prestigious St. Leo's Catholic church, Dunnigan goes to Father Paul, the priest of the smaller and poorer Polish St. Michael's church in accordance with Olga's wishes. Showing Dunnigan where Olga's parents are buried in the graveyard atop a hill, away from the dust of the mines, Fr. Paul sings, a cappella – in both English and Polish, the plaintive "Ever Homeward", the only song in the film.

The main flashback story then begins, showing how Olga is plucked from a chorus line in a nightclub to serve as the stand-in for an extremely temperamental film actress who is to star as Joan of Arc in a motion picture. Dunnigan realizes that Olga has the makings of a talented actress herself, and when the film's star throws a tantrum and walks out, he manages to convince Marcus Harris, the film's producer, to audition Olga, despite her having had no film experience. The screen test is a success and Olga is cast as Joan. However, as filming progresses, she shows signs of being seriously ill. After inquiring after her health from her doctor, Dunnigan is secretly informed that Olga has a severe, fatal form of tuberculosis, likely caused by her inhalation of the coal dust where she grew up. Desperate to do something for her hometown that will restore the pride of its bitter and disillusioned citizens, Olga continues with the filming, and collapses after the shooting ends. Rushed to a hospital, she dies with Dunnigan at her side.

To generate interest in the film, the grief-stricken Dunnigan desperately pulls a publicity stunt, convincing all five churches in Coaltown to ring their bells for three days as a tribute to the dead actress, paying them with checks that he cannot cover. Huge interest begins to develop in the unknown actress who gave her life to complete the film, and Marcus Harris wires Dunnigan enough money to cover the checks. But Harris calls Dunnigan and tells him that he has decided not to release the film, because the moviegoing public might resent greeting the arrival of a new star who has died. Harris intends to recast the role and begin filming all over again.

On the day of Olga's funeral, an overflow crowd which includes Dunnigan enters the tiny local church, which has never been so full. As the crowd prays, a loud creaking noise is heard, and the statues of St. Michael and the Virgin Mary slowly turn on their pedestals until they face Olga's coffin. The parishioners regard this as a miracle, even though Fr. Paul has already gone to the basement (to ensure the safety of the parishioners) and determined the ground has shifted—causing the pillars which support the statues under the church to move because of the large crowd.  Dunnigan persuades Father Paul not to quash the faith of the people of Coaltown. Marcus Harris, after much reluctance, decides to release the film, which becomes a huge success. Fr. Paul is overwhelmed by the nationwide donations his church has received and the movie studio's offer to build a hospital/clinic to fight the disease which cost Olga her life.

Cast
 Fred MacMurray as William 'Bill' Dunnigan
 Alida Valli as Olga Treskovna (credited as Valli)
 Frank Sinatra as the priest, Father Paul
 Lee J. Cobb as Marcus Harris
 Harold Vermilyea as Nick Orloff
 Charles Meredith as Father J. Spinsky
 James Nolan as Tod Jones
 Veronica Pataky as Anna Klovna
 Philip Ahn as Ming Gow
 Frank Ferguson as Mike Dolan
 Frank Wilcox as Dr. Jennings
 Dorothy Sebastian as Miss Katie Orwin (uncredited)
 Michael Raffetto as Harold Tanby (uncredited)

Production
The film was put into production at the same time that Ingrid Bergman was filming her own Technicolor Joan of Arc, which was also released by RKO in 1948. Ironically, the very expensive Bergman film, although much more highly regarded today, was not a success upon release, unlike the fictional Joan of Arc film depicted in The Miracle of the Bells.

Several exterior scenes were shot on location in Glen Lyon, Pennsylvania, the mining town on which the fictional Coaltown of the novel and film was based. Many of the extras in the film were actual miners working for the Glen-Alden Coal Company.

Release
The film encountered distribution difficulties in England because of a boycott against the films of Ben Hecht. Hecht had made derogatory comments about the presence of Britain in Palestine.

The premiere for the film was unique.  It took place on Friday, March 26, 1948 at the then "Park Theater" on Brownsville Road in the little Coal Mining town of Library, Pennsylvania.  Although the movie was not filmed in Library, the town was chosen to host the premiere because it "most resembled a typical American mining community, like the one portrayed in the movie."  Accompanying the premiere, a large motorcade escorted movie stars Charles Coburn, Ruth Warrick and Leo Carrillo into the town of Library. The stars visited the War Memorial just down the road from the theater, where they addressed the enormous crowd of locals who showed up for the pomp and celebration. The theater is still standing today, and over the years has been converted for other uses, such as a Dance Studio and a Boxing Gym.

Reception
The Miracle of the Bells was dismissed by critics, and was mentioned in the satirical film book The Golden Turkey Awards, which poked fun at Frank Sinatra's portrayal of Father Paul. Time magazine excoriated the film upon release, declaring in their review that "St. Michael ought to sue". In recent decades the film has developed a better reputation due to its realistic portrayal of coal miners in small town America.

Box office
The film recorded a loss of $640,000.

Radio adaptation
The Miracle of the Bells was presented on Lux Radio Theatre May 31, 1948. The adaptation starred MacMurray, Valli, and Sinatra.

References

External links
 
 
 
 

1948 films
1948 drama films
American drama films
American black-and-white films
Films about Catholicism
Films about filmmaking
Films based on American novels
Films directed by Irving Pichel
Films scored by Leigh Harline
Films set in Pennsylvania
Films shot in Pennsylvania
Films with screenplays by Ben Hecht
Publicity stunts in fiction
RKO Pictures films
1940s English-language films
1940s American films